The 2021 São Paulo Challenger de Tênis was a professional tennis tournament played on clay courts. It was the seventh edition of the tournament which was part of the 2021 ATP Challenger Tour. It took place in São Paulo, Brazil between 29 November and 5 December 2021.

Singles main-draw entrants

Seeds

 1 Rankings as of 22 November 2021.

Other entrants
The following players received wildcards into the singles main draw:
  Mateus Alves
  Oscar José Gutierrez
  Gustavo Heide

The following players received entry into the singles main draw as alternates:
  Daniel Dutra da Silva
  Alejandro González
  Facundo Juárez
  Gilbert Klier Júnior

The following players received entry from the qualifying draw:
  Luciano Darderi
  Igor Marcondes
  Gonzalo Villanueva
  Matías Zukas

The following player received entry as a lucky loser:
  Alejandro Gómez

Champions

Singles

  Juan Pablo Ficovich def.  Luciano Darderi 6–3, 7–5.

Doubles

  Nicolás Barrientos /  Alejandro Gómez def.  Rafael Matos /  Felipe Meligeni Alves Walkover.

References

São Paulo Challenger de Tênis
2021
November 2021 sports events in Brazil
December 2021 sports events in Brazil
2021 in Brazilian sport